Jéssica Correa Delboni (born 7 September 1993) is a Brazilian mixed martial artist, currently competing in the atomweight division of Invicta FC, where she is the former Atomweight champion.

Mixed martial arts career

Early career
Delboni made her professional debut against Juliana Costa at HCC 12. She won the fight by unanimous decision. Delboni likewise won her next two fights against Cristiane Lima and Bianca Sattelmayer by unanimous decision.

Delboni was scheduled to fight Joice Mara at Shooto Brasil 74. She won the fight by unanimous decision.

Delboni was next scheduled to fight Pamela Ferreira at Angels & Fight Contest 2. She won the fight by unanimous decision. Delboni was afterwards scheduled to fight Bruna Brasil at Maringá Combat 5. Delboni won the fight by TKO.

Delboni was scheduled to fight Liana Pirosin at Imortal FC 8. She beat Pirosin by unanimous decision.

Invicta and Shooto Brasil
On April 15, 2018, multiple media outlets announced that Delboni had signed with Invicta Fighting Championships.

Delboni was scheduled to make her Invicta debut against Ashley Cummins at Invicta FC 32: Spencer vs. Sorenson. The fight was also Delboni's atomweight debut. Cummins won the fight by unanimous decision.

Delboni was scheduled to fight Maiara Amanajás in a strawweight bout at Shooto Brasil 91. She won the fight by split decision.

For her next fight, Delboni returned both to Invicta and atomweight, being scheduled to fight Lindsey VanZandt at Invicta FC 36 - Sorenson vs. Young. Delboni was once again won by split decision.

Delboni moved back up in weight to strawweight to fight Julia Polastri for the vacant Shooto Brasil strawweight title, at Shooto Brasil 97. Polastri won the fight by a second-round knockout.

Delboni was scheduled to fight the former Invicta Atomweight champion Herica Tiburcio in a strawweight bout, at Invicta FC 42: Cummins vs. Zappitella. Delboni won the fight by unanimous decision.

Her victory against a former champion earned Delboni the right to challenge Alesha Zappitella for the Invicta FC Atomweight Championship at Invicta 44: Rodríguez vs. Torquato. Zappitella won the fight by majority decision. Two of the judges scored the fight 48-47 in Zappitella's favor, while the third judge scored it 48-47 in Delboni's favor. All of the media members scored the fight for Delboni.

Delboni participated in the Invicta FC Phoenix Tournament, which was held to determine the next atomweight title challenger. Delboni won the quarterfinal and semifinal bouts against Tabatha Watkins and Marisa Messer-Belenchia by decision, and faced Lindsey VanZandt in the finals. She beat VanZandt by unanimous decision, with scores of 30-27, 29-28 and 29-28.

Invicta FC Atomweight champion
Delboni rematched Alesha Zappitella for the Invicta FC Atomweight Championship on January 12, 2022 at Invicta FC 45. She won the bout and the title via unanimous decision, two scorecards of 50–45 and one scorecard of 49–46.

Delboni made her first Invicta Atomweight title defense against Jillian DeCoursey at Invicta FC 49: Delboni vs. DeCoursey on September 28, 2022. She lost the fight by a first-round submission.

Post-championship reign
Delboni is scheduled to face Danielle Taylor on May 3, 2023, at Invicta FC 53: DeCoursey vs. Dos Santos.

Championships and accomplishments

Mixed Martial Arts 

 Invicta Fighting Championships
 Invicta Phoenix Atomweight Tournament Winner
 Invicta FC Atomweight Championship (One time, former)

Mixed martial arts record

 
|-
|Loss
|align=center| 12–4
|Jillian DeCoursey
|Submission (rear-naked choke)
|Invicta FC 49: Delboni vs. DeCoursey
|
|align=center|1
|align=center|4:49
|Hinton, Oklahoma, United States
|
|-
| Win
| align=center| 12–3
| Alesha Zappitella
| Decision (unanimous)
| Invicta FC 45: Zappitella vs. Delboni II
| 
| align=center| 5
| align=center| 5:00
| Kansas City, Kansas, United States
|
|-
| Win
| align=center| 11–3
| Lindsey VanZandt
| Decision (unanimous)
| Invicta FC Phoenix Tournament: Atomweight
| 
| align=center| 3
| align=center| 5:00
| Kansas City, Kansas, United States
|
|-
| Loss
| align=center| 10–3
| Alesha Zappitella
| Decision (split)
| Invicta FC 44: Rodríguez vs. Torquato
| 
| align=center| 5
| align=center| 5:00
| Kansas City, Kansas, United States
|
|-
| Win
| align=center| 10–2
| Herica Tiburcio
| Decision (unanimous)
| Invicta FC 42: Cummins vs. Zappitella
| 
| align=center| 3
| align=center| 5:00
| Kansas City, Kansas, United States
|
|-
| Loss
| align=center| 9–2
| Julia Polastri
| TKO (punches)
| Shooto Brasil 97
| 
| align=center| 2
| align=center| 4:35
| Rio de Janeiro, Brazil
| Return to strawweight. For the Shooto Brasil Strawweight title.
|-
| Win
| align=center| 9–1
| Lindsey VanZandt
| Decision (split)
| Invicta FC 36: Sorenson vs. Young
| 
| align=center| 3
| align=center| 5:00
| Kansas City, Kansas, United States
| Return to atomweight
|-
| Win
| align=center| 8–1
| Maiara Amanajás
| Decision (split)
| Shooto Brasil 91
| 
| align=center| 3
| align=center| 5:00
| Rio de Janeiro, Brazil
| Return to strawweight
|-
| Loss
| align=center| 7–1
| Ashley Cummins
| Decision (unanimous)
| Invicta FC 32: Spencer vs. Sorenson
| 
| align=center| 3
| align=center| 5:00
| Shawnee, Oklahoma, United States
| Atomweight debut
|-
| Win
| align=center| 7–0
| Liana Pirosin
| Decision (unanimous)
| Imortal FC 8
| 
| align=center| 3
| align=center| 5:00
| São José dos Pinhais, Brazil
| 
|-
| Win
| align=center| 6–0
| Bruna Brasil
| TKO (punches)
| Maringá Combat 5
| 
| align=center| 2
| align=center| N/A
| Maringá, Brazil
| 
|-
| Win
| align=center| 5–0
| Pamela Ferreira
| TKO (punches)
| Angels & Fight Contest 2
| 
| align=center| 1
| align=center| 3:08
| Rio de Janeiro, Brazil
| 
|-
| Win
| align=center| 4–0
| Joice Mara
| Decision (unanimous)
| Shooto Brasil 74
| 
| align=center| 3
| align=center| 5:00
| Rio de Janeiro, Brazil
| 
|-
| Win
| align=center| 3–0
| Bianca Sattelmayer
| Decision (unanimous)
| Curitiba Top Fight 11
| 
| align=center| 3
| align=center| 5:00
| Curitiba, Brazil
| 
|-
| Win
| align=center| 2–0
| Cristiane Lima
| Decision (unanimous)
| Rei da CBX 2
| 
| align=center| 3
| align=center| 5:00
| Salvador, Bahia, Brazil
| 
|-
| Win
| align=center| 1–0
| Juliana Costa
| Decision (unanimous)
| HCC 12
| 
| align=center| 3
| align=center| 5:00
| Vitória, Espírito Santo, Brazil
| Strawweight debut.
|-

See also
 List of female mixed martial artists
 List of current Invicta FC fighters

References

External links
 
 Jéssica Delboni at Invicta FC

1993 births
Living people
Atomweight mixed martial artists
Brazilian female mixed martial artists
LGBT mixed martial artists
Strawweight mixed martial artists
Mixed martial artists utilizing taekwondo
Mixed martial artists utilizing Brazilian jiu-jitsu
Brazilian practitioners of Brazilian jiu-jitsu
Female Brazilian jiu-jitsu practitioners
Brazilian female taekwondo practitioners
People from Vila Velha
LGBT taekwondo practitioners
Sportspeople from Espírito Santo
21st-century Brazilian women